Jordan Devlin (born 15 March 1990) is an Irish professional wrestler. He is currently signed to WWE, where he performs on the NXT brand under the ring name JD McDonagh. He previously performed in NXT UK, where was a one-time and the longest reigning NXT Cruiserweight Champion. His other accomplishments include being a two-time OTT World Champion and a one-time PROGRESS Tag Team Champion. Devlin is also known for his tenure in Japan with Pro Wrestling Zero1, wrestling under the name Frank David and becoming a one-time Zero1 International Lightweight Tag Team Champion.

Early life
Devlin was born on 15 March 1990 in Bray, County Wicklow. He was educated at C.B.C. Monkstown in Dublin's Monkstown suburb, and later graduated with a BA from University College Dublin.

Professional wrestling career

Independent circuit (2006–2018)
Beginning when he was 12 years old, Devlin was trained to be a professional wrestler by Fergal Devitt (also known as Finn Bálor) and Paul Tracey. At the age of 21, Devlin spent six months wrestling for Pro Wrestling Zero1 in Japan, where he and Shawn Guinness would win the Zero1 International Lightweight Tag Team Champion.

Devlin is the inaugural Over the Top Wrestling World Heavyweight Champion, having defeated Mark Haskins in December 2017. He was defeated by WALTER for the title on 18 August 2018.

In 2017, Devlin joined Insane Championship Wrestling (ICW), where he wrestled Trent Seven for the ICW World Heavyweight Championship. Devlin lost the match and later had to have staples in the back of his head to close a wound sustained in the match. Devlin became a Progress Tag Team Champion alongside Scotty Davis after defeating Grizzled Young Veterans and Aussie Open at Chapter 95 : Still Chasing.

WWE (2016–present)

Early appearances (2016–2019) 

On 15 December 2016, Devlin was announced as one of 16 men competing in the first ever United Kingdom Championship Tournament  to crown the first ever WWE United Kingdom Champion on 14 and 15 January 2017. Devlin defeated Danny Burch in the first round, advancing to the quarter finals, where he was defeated by Tyler Bate. Devlin also appeared at several WWE live shows. On 18 May 2018, WWE announced via their YouTube channel that Devlin would be one of 16 contestants in the second annual United Kingdom Championship Tournament. He defeated Tyson T-Bone in the first round but lost to Flash Morgan Webster in round two.

After some disagreements in the following episodes of NXT UK, a match against Travis Banks was agreed for NXT UK Takeover: Blackpool. However, that night both competitors attacked each other before the bell was hit, with Banks being the most affected. Devlin, getting into the ring, referred to himself as Ireland's best fighter, therefore establishing himself as a heel. He was interrupted by the general manager of the brand, Johnny Saint, who went out to agree a match against an unknown fighter who turned out to be Finn Bálor.

On 26 and 27 January, Devlin participated in the Worlds Collide tournament which featured superstars from NXT, 205 Live, and NXT UK. He won a 15-man battle royal to earn a bye in the first round. He defeated Drew Gulak in the quarterfinals while being eliminated by Velveteen Dream in the semifinals.

NXT Cruiserweight Champion (2020–2021) 
On the 23 January episode of NXT UK, Devlin defeated El Ligero in an NXT Cruiserweight Championship Qualifying Match to face Angel Garza for the NXT Cruiserweight Championship. At Worlds Collide, Devlin won a fatal four way match, defeating Travis Banks, Isaiah "Swerve" Scott, and Angel Garza to become the new NXT Cruiserweight Champion. Devlin would go on to successfully defend the title all over NXT, NXT UK and 205 Live against opponents such as Lio Rush, Tony Nese, Tyler Breeze and Banks.

In April 2020, it was revealed that Devlin was unable to defend the Cruiserweight Championship due to travel restrictions caused by the COVID-19 pandemic in Ireland. This led to the announcement of a tournament to crown an interim Cruiserweight Champion, which was won by Santos Escobar. Devlin responded by calling whoever won the tournament a "fraud" and stating that he would prove himself as the true Cruiserweight Champion upon his eventual return. On 10 March 2021, it was revealed that Devlin would appear in NXT on the following week to enter into his feud with the interim Cruiserweight Champion, Santos Escobar. On Night 2 of NXT TakeOver: Stand & Deliver, Escobar defeated Devlin to end his reign at 438 days.

Various feuds and NXT United Kingdom Championship pursuits (2021–2022)
The following week, Devlin confronted Ilja Dragunov. Although he did not say anything, he made his intentions to challenge Dragunov for the NXT UK Championship quite clear. Devlin faced Ilja Dragunov in an empty arena, but failed to capture the NXT UK Championship. After trading verbal shots with Ilja Dragunov, Devlin would get another chance at the NXT UK Championship, under the stipulation that the loser leaves NXT UK. The match would take place on the 200th episode of NXT UK where Devlin failed to win the title, marking his final appearance for the brand.

Move to NXT (2022–present)
On the 21 June episode of NXT 2.0, a vignette aired announcing Devlin's arrival on the NXT brand under the new ring name JD McDonagh. At NXT: The Great American Bash on 5 July, he made his debut by attacking NXT Champion Bron Breakker after he defended the title against Cameron Grimes. On the 12 July episode of NXT 2.0, McDonagh interrupted Grimes on stage and attacked him, only for the latter to retaliate, thus setting up a match between the two the following week, which he won. At NXT Heatwave on 16 August, McDonagh unsuccessfully challenged Breakker for the NXT Championship. McDonagh received another title shot, at Halloween Havoc on October 22, in a triple threat match also involving Ilja Dragunov, but once again failed to win the title.

Other media
In May 2017, Devlin appeared in the WWE 24 network special on Finn Bálor. Devlin is a playable character in WWE 2K22 as Jordan Devlin.

Championships and accomplishments
British Championship Wrestling
BCW Tag Team Championship (1 time) – with Sean South
Fight Factory Pro Wrestling
Irish Junior Heavyweight Championship (1 time)
NWA Ireland
NWA Ireland Junior Heavyweight Championship (1 time)
NWA Ireland Tag Team Championship (1 time) - with Sir Michael W. Winchester
Over the Top Wrestling
 OTT World Championship (2 times)
OTT No Limits World Heavyweight Championship (1 time)
Premier British Wrestling
PBW Tag Team Championship (1 time) - with Sean South
 Progress Wrestling
Progress Tag Team Championship (1 time) - with Scotty Davis
Pro Wrestling Illustrated
 Ranked No. 58 of the top 500 singles wrestlers in the PWI 500 in 2019
Pro Wrestling Zero1
NWA International Lightweight Tag Team Championship (1 time) – with Shawn Guinness
TNT Extreme Wrestling
TNT World Championship (1 time)
WWE
NXT Cruiserweight Championship (1 time)

References

External links

1990 births
Living people
People from Bray, County Wicklow
Sportspeople from County Wicklow
Irish male professional wrestlers
Alumni of University College Dublin
People educated at C.B.C. Monkstown
NXT/WWE Cruiserweight Champions
21st-century professional wrestlers
PROGRESS Tag Team Champions